Peace Project may refer to:

 Generally, projects intended to bring about peace
 The Peace Project, a non-profit organization
 "The Peace Project", an album by Hillsong Worship
 Everest Peace Project, a peace-through-mountaineering organization
 Zimbabwe Peace Project, a human-rights-monitoring organization
 Peace Crane Project, involving origami
 Mostar Friedensprojekt